ROKS Chungnam (FF-953) is the third ship of the Ulsan-class frigate in the Republic of Korea Navy. She is named after the province, Chungnam.

Development 

In the early 1990s, the Korean government plan for the construction of next generation coastal ships named Frigate 2000 was scrapped due to the 1997 Asian financial crisis. But the decommissioning of the  destroyers and the aging fleet of Ulsan-class frigates, the plan was revived as the Future Frigate eXperimental, also known as FFX in the early 2000s. 

10 ships were launched and commissioned from 1980 to 1993. They have 3 different variants which consists of Flight I, Flight II and Flight III.

Construction and career 
ROKS Chungnam was launched on 26 October 1984 by Hanjin Heavy Industries and commissioned on 1 June 1986.

She was decommissioned on 27 December 2017 and expected to be used as a training ship.

References

External links

1984 ships
Ulsan-class frigates
Frigates of the Republic of Korea Navy
Ships built by Hanjin Heavy Industries